Sir William Beecher (1580–1651) was an English diplomat, soldier and politician who sat in the House of Commons at various times between 1614 and 1629.

Beecher was Chargé d'Affaires in France from 1609 to 1610. In 1614, he was elected Member of Parliament for Knaresborough in the Addled Parliament.  He was Agent or Chargé d'Affaires in Francs from 1617 to 1619. In 1621 he was elected MP for Shaftesbury and Leominster  and was expelled at Shaftesbury. He was knighted in 1622. He served as Clerk of the Privy Council from 1623 until he resigned in 1641.  In 1624 he was elected MP for Leominster again. He was elected MP for Dover in 1625 and for Ilchester in 1626. In 1627 he took part in the  Siege of Saint-Martin-de-Ré when he commanded a small supply fleet with 400 raw troops.  In 1629 he was elected MP for Windsor  and sat until 1629 when King Charles decided to rule without parliament for eleven years. He was awarded MA at Cambridge University in 1629. 
 
Beecher was of Durham Gate, The Strand, Westminster and of Putney, Surrey. He died in 1651.

References

 

 

 

1580 births
1651 deaths
Alumni of Peterhouse, Cambridge
Members of the Parliament of England for Dover
17th-century English diplomats
English MPs 1614
English MPs 1621–1622
English MPs 1624–1625
English MPs 1625
English MPs 1626
English MPs 1628–1629
Clerks of the Privy Council